Christianné Allen is a communications professional who, until the week of August 29, 2021, worked for the legal and consulting firm of Giuliani Partners. She served as Director of Communication for Rudy Giuliani, is a Liberty University online communications major (Class of 2022), and was involved with the firm between August 2019 and August 2021. Allen announced her departure from the firm in late August 2021.

Allen lists herself as an ambassador for Turning Point USA and the Falkirk Center at Liberty University, a think tank started in November 2019.

References 

Spokespersons
Liberty University people
Year of birth missing (living people)
Living people
Rudy Giuliani